The 1956 Paris–Roubaix was the 54th edition of the Paris–Roubaix, a classic one-day cycle race in France. The single day event was held on 8 April 1956 and stretched  from Paris to the finish at Roubaix Velodrome. The winner was Louison Bobet from France.

Results

References

1956
1956 in road cycling
1956 in French sport
1956 Challenge Desgrange-Colombo
April 1956 sports events in Europe